The Amargosa River is an intermittent waterway, 185 miles (298 km) long, in southern Nevada and eastern California in the United States.  It drains a high desert region, the Amargosa Valley in the Amargosa Desert northwest of Las Vegas, into the Mojave Desert, and finally into Death Valley where it disappears into the ground aquifer. Except for a small portion of its route in the Amargosa Canyon in California and a small portion at Beatty, Nevada, the river flows above ground only after a rare rainstorm washes the region. A 26-mile (42 km) stretch of the river between Shoshone and Dumont Dunes is protected as a National Wild and Scenic River. At the south end of Tecopa Valley the Amargosa River Natural Area protects the habitat.

Course
Except during flash floods that occur after cloudbursts, most of the course of the Amargosa River is dry on the surface. The flow is generally underground except for stretches near Beatty and near Tecopa, California, in the Amargosa Canyon. In the canyon, the river passes through the Amargosa River Natural Area, a region of dense greenery and prolific wildlife made possible by the presence of water.

Thirsty Canyon Wash enters at the river's source, and when carrying water, the river flows from there southwest into Oasis Valley. Running parallel to U.S. Route 95 near the Bullfrog Hills to the west (right bank), the river receives Sober-Up Gulch from the right and then Beatty Wash from the left bank.

Another  or so downstream, the river flows through Beatty and turns south-southeast through the Amargosa Narrows into the Amargosa Desert. At this point, Bare Mountain lies to the left, and the Grapevine and Funeral Mountains of the Amargosa Range lie to the right. Downstream of the Narrows, still flowing roughly parallel to Route 95, the river passes Big Dune, which is on the river's left. Shortly after that, it passes the town of Amargosa Valley on the left, leaves Nevada, and enters Inyo County, California. In this stretch, it receives Forty Mile Wash from the left.
 
Running roughly parallel to California Route 127, the river passes through Death Valley Junction. Shortly after, it receives Carson Slough, which drains Ash Meadows National Wildlife Refuge, from the left. Soon the river passes between the Resting Spring Range to the left and the Greenwater Range to the right before reaching Shoshone. Below Shoshone, the river continues roughly parallel to Route 127 to Tecopa.  Downstream of Tecopa, with the Old Spanish Trail, it passes through the Amargosa Canyon between the Sperry Hills on the right and the Dumont Hills on the left, enters San Bernardino County, California, and flows by Dumont Dunes in the northern Mojave Desert. Turning west, the river crosses under Route 127 and enters Death Valley National Park between the south end of the Amargosa Range on the right and the Avawatz Mountains on the left.

Turning northwest and then north, the river re-enters Inyo County, passing between the Owlshead Mountains on the left and the Ibex Hills on the right and receives Confidence Wash and Rhodes Wash, both from the right.
In this stretch, the river runs roughly parallel to Harry Wade Road and, further north, to California Route 178 and West Side Road. Disappearing into the ground, it feeds the aquifer that is the remnant of prehistoric Lake Manly.

Discharge

History
The name of the river comes from the Spanish word, amargo, for "bitter", probably shortened from agua amargosa, "bitter water". The name was first recorded in 1844 and is believed to refer to the alkaline water. The river is an ancient stream, following an antecedent canyon. Evidence of human habitation along the river goes back more than 10,000 years.  In addition to prehistoric Lake Manly in Death Valley, the middle river valley was submerged during the late Pleistocene by prehistoric Lake Tecopa.

The canyon floor along the Amargosa Range has remnants of indigenous habitations that are protected by the Bureau of Land Management. The Old Spanish Trail followed the course of the river in the Amargosa Canyon during the 19th century. From 1907 to 1941, the Tonopah and Tidewater Railroad followed the lower course of the river serving remote Death Valley communities.

In March 2009, as part of the Eastern Sierra and Northern San Gabriel Wild Heritage Act, a  stretch of the river between Shoshone and Dumont Dunes was protected as a Wild and Scenic River.

See also
List of National Wild and Scenic Rivers
List of rivers in the Great Basin

References

Further reading

External links

 Amargosa River Natural Area - BLM page
 Friends of the River: Amargosa River
 Amargosa River virtual tours
 Amargosa Conservancy

Rivers of Nevada
Rivers of Southern California
Death Valley
Amargosa Desert
Mojave Desert
Wild and Scenic Rivers of the United States
Rivers of the Great Basin
Rivers of San Bernardino County, California
Rivers of Inyo County, California
Rivers of Nye County, Nevada